Stauropteridales are an extinct group of plants in the fern division.

References
Thomas N. Taylor, Edith L. Taylor, Michael Krings: Paleobotany. The Biology and Evolution of Fossil Plants . Second Edition, Academic Press 2009, p. 405-407.

Devonian plants
Pennsylvanian plants
Devonian first appearances
Pennsylvanian extinctions
Prehistoric plant orders
Fern orders